Český Brod is a town in Kolín District in the Central Bohemian Region of the Czech Republic. It has about 7,100 inhabitants. The town centre is well preserved and is protected by law as an urban monument zone.

Administrative parts
Villages of Liblice and Štolmíř are administrative parts of Český Brod.

Geography
It lies in a flat agricultural landscape of the Central Elbe Table. The Šembera river flows through the town.

History
Český Brod was probably founded in the 12th century by the bishop of Prague Jan I. In 1286, it was promoted to a town. From that time till the beginning of the 14th century, the town's name was Biskupský Brod (Broda Episcopalis, meaning "Bishop's ford"). In 1437, the Holy Roman Emperor Sigismund designated Český Brod a free royal town.

Until 1918, the town was part of the Austrian monarchy (in the Austrian part of the empire after the compromise of 1867), head of the Böhmisch Brod – Český Brod District, one of the 94 Bezirkshauptmannschaften in Bohemia.

Demographics

Education
In Český Brod, there are 3 kindergartens, 2 elementary schools, a school for students with special needs, a gymnasium, and a high school of economics (in Liblice).

Culture
Rock for People, an annual summer music festival, was held in Český Brod from 1995 to 2006. In 2007 it was decided to relocate this festival to Hradec Králové.

Sights

The remains of the town walls have been preserved almost the entire perimeter of the old town. Despite their incompleteness, the preserved fortifications of Český Brod are among the most important examples of town fortifications from the reign of George of Poděbrady.

The Church of Saint Gotthard was originally a Romanesque church from the 1130s. It was rebuilt in the Gothic style in the mid-14th century, modified in the Renaissance style in the 17th century, and then completely rebuilt in the Baroque style in 1765–1772. A late Gothic belfry from 1578–1580 stands next to the church.

The Church of the Holy Trinity is a Renaissance building from 1560–1562, originally built behind the town walls as a cemetery church.

The Old Town Hall is one of the oldest town hall buildings in the Czech Republic. The originally Gothic house was built before 1402. Today it is the seat of a gallery, the town's cultural and information centre and the town library. The premises of the former prison are used for exhibition purposes.

The current Neo-Renaissance town hall was built in 1897–1898. It has been used as the town hall since 1949 and is also protected as a cultural monument.

Trivia
A large medium wave broadcasting facility is located in Liblice part of Český Brod.

Notable people
František Mrázek (1958–2006), entrepreneur
Tomáš Skuhravý (born 1965), footballer

Twin towns – sister cities

Český Brod is twinned with:
 Köngen, Germany

Český Brod also has friendly relations with Southwell in England, United Kingdom.

References

External links

 
Brief history of the town 
Photogallery of Český Brod

Cities and towns in the Czech Republic
Populated places in Kolín District